Al-Sayeda Zainab Mosque is a historic mosque in Cairo, Egypt, and constitutes one of the most important and biggest mosques in the history of Egypt. The name is an honor to Sayyida Zaynab bint Ali, one of the daughters of 'Ali, fourth Caliph and first Shia Imam, and his first wife Fatimah, the daughter of the Islamic prophet Muhammad.

Location 
The mosque is located in Al-Sayeda Zainab neighborhood of Cairo, where its name was taken from the name of the mosque. The mosque occupies the center of the neighborhood and there is Al-Sayeda Zainab square in front of the mosque. The square is one of the most famous and important squares in Cairo, and there are numerous restaurants and cafes packed with people especially during the breakfast and sahur time of the Islamic month of Ramadan. Zayn al-Abidin street connects the mosque to the different major locations in Cairo.

History 
The mosque was considered built on top of the grave of Sayyida Zaynab the sister of Hasan and Husain (among others). Some historians consider that Sayyida Zaynab was exiled to Egypt few months after the Battle of Karbala where she settled for nine months before her death, and she was buried in this site. As such, the location is considered one of the most notable places of Islamic history and the most popular tombs to visit among Sunnis and Isma'ilis. However, many people, primarily Twelver Shias, believe that Sayyida Zaynab was actually buried in Damascus, Syria, where the Sayyidah Zaynab Mosque is located today.

There is no accurate record of when the mosque was built over the grave of Sayyida Zaynab, and no historical references are currently available except for Ottoman Ali Pasha's order for renovation in 1547, and since then there were other renovations, including the one conducted by Amir Abdul Rahman in 1768 and the one in 1940 by the Ministry of Endowment which demolished the old building completely and built the current building. Henceforth, the mosque is not registered as an artifact of Islamic history. The mosque at the time consisted of seven corridors parallel to the wall of the qibla with a square dish covered with a dome. On the opposite side of the qibla wall is the mausoleum of Sayyida Zaynab, surrounded by a brass fence and topped by a tall dome. In 1969, the Ministry of Endowment doubled the area of the mosque.

See also 

 Sayyidah Zaynab Mosque - A mosque in Damascus, Syria where is also considered the place of burial of Sayyida Zainab according to Shia tradition.
  Lists of mosques 
  List of mosques in Africa
  List of mosques in Egypt

References 

Mosques in Cairo
Mosque buildings with domes
Mosques completed in 1547